Niebla  turgida  is a fruticose lichen that grows on rocks in the fog zone along the Pacific Coast of  Baja California in the Northern Vizcaíno Desert  The epithet,  turgida  is in reference to the swollen branches of the thallus.

Distinguishing features

Niebla  turgida  is distinguished by a yellow green bushy thallus to 6 cm high and 15 cm across, divided into tubular swollen branches; the primary branches, which are often round in cross section near base, are loosely connected to a yellowish pigmented holdfast, blackened slightly above base, curve upwards or spread widely and become entangled,  mostly narrow in length and prismatic to partially flattened above in cross section, variously fringed along the branch margins, often long tapered to the tip. The cortex is relatively thin, 35–50 µm thick, with prominent network of raised vein-like ridges on the surface,  the longitudinal ridges generally not defining the branch margins, interconnected by diagonal ridges that fork and connect to other ridges; black dot-like pycnidia conspicuous along the cortical ridges; apothecia often in small clusters on lobes of terminal short spur-like branches; the key lichen substance is divaricatic acid, with triterpenes.  Similar species are Niebla podetiaforma, distinguished by the smaller thallus with less prominent cortical ridges, and Niebla juncosa that differs by longitudinal cortical ridges that define the branch margins.

Taxonomic history

Niebla turgida was  recognized in regard to pursuing a lichen flora of Baja California from thalli collected inland from the coast between Punta Negra and Punta Rocosa during March 1988. The species (N. turgida) is a common lichen on boulders of slopes and mesas north of Puerto Catarina.

Niebla turgida has been included under a very broad species concept of Niebla homalea;  one that essentially recognizes only three species in the genus Niebla as defined by Spjut. A taxonomic treatment for the broad concept of Niebla homalea and the genus has many inconsistencies, however.

References

Notes

External links
World Botanical Associates, Niebla turgida, retrieved 26 Dec 2014, http://www.worldbotanical.com/niebla_turgida.htm#turgida
Lichen Flora of the Greater Sonoran Desert: Book Review, Richard Spjut, web page, http://www.worldbotanical.com/lichen%20flora%20review.htm

Lichen species
Lichens of North America
Ramalinaceae
Lichens described in 1996
Taxa named by Richard Wayne Spjut